Maurice Marie Lecoq (26 March 1854 – 16 December 1925) was a French sport shooter who competed in the late 19th century and early 20th century. He participated in Shooting at the 1900 Summer Olympics in Paris and won a silver medal with the French military pistol team and a bronze medal in the military rifle team. He also competed at the 1906 Intercalated Games and the 1908 Summer Olympics.

References

External links
 

1854 births
1925 deaths
French male sport shooters
Olympic silver medalists for France
Olympic bronze medalists for France
Olympic shooters of France
Shooters at the 1900 Summer Olympics
Shooters at the 1906 Intercalated Games
Shooters at the 1908 Summer Olympics
Olympic medalists in shooting
Medalists at the 1900 Summer Olympics
Medalists at the 1906 Intercalated Games
Medalists at the 1908 Summer Olympics
Sportspeople from Angers
20th-century French people